The 2016–17 Marquette Golden Eagles women's basketball team represented Marquette University in the 2016–17 NCAA Division I women's basketball season. The Golden Eagles, led by third year head coach Carolyn Kieger, played their home games at the Al McGuire Center and were members of the Big East Conference. They finished the season 25–8, 13–5 in Big East play to finish in third place. They won the Big East tournament title for the first time in school history and earned an automatic bid to the NCAA women's tournament where they received a No. 5 seed in the Stockton Region. They were upset by No. 12 seed Quinnipiac in the first round.

Roster

Schedule

|-
!colspan=9 style="background:#00386D; color:#FDBB30;"|Exhibition

|-
!colspan=9 style="background:#00386D; color:#FDBB30;"| Non-conference regular season

|-
!colspan=9 style="background:#00386D; color:#FDBB30;"| Big East regular season

|-
!colspan=9 style="background:#00386D; color:#FDBB30;"| Big East  Women's Tournament

|-
!colspan=9 style="background:#00386D; color:#FDBB30;"| NCAA Women's Tournament

Rankings
2016–17 NCAA Division I women's basketball rankings

See also
2016–17 Marquette Golden Eagles men's basketball team

References

Marquette
Marquette Golden Eagles women's basketball seasons
Marquette
Marquette
Marquette